Brother Thomas Bezanson (August 5, 1929 – August 16, 2007) was a Canadian-born artist and Benedictine monk primarily known for his porcelain pottery and mastery of complex glazes. Strongly influenced by Asian pottery, often adapting traditional Chinese and Japanese pottery methods and materials to his work.

Biography 
Brother Thomas was born in Halifax, Nova Scotia, a descendant of Irish and Scottish families that had been in Nova Scotia for many generations. In 1950 he graduated from Nova Scotia College of Art and Design. He also spent some time in New York City studying at Art Students League of New York. From 1951–58 he both worked in business and was an advisor to the  Nova Scotia Handcraft Century. He began working in pottery in 1953. In 1958–59 he traveled and studied in Europe. In 1959 he entered the Benedictine Monastery, Weston Priory, in Weston, VT. In 1968 he graduated from University of Ottawa with a master's degree in Philosophy and a University Gold Medal. In 1976 he was a visiting lecturer at Alfred University School of Ceramics. In 1978 he traveled in Japan and to Taipei. While in Japan he met with five "Living National Treasure (Japan)" potters. In 1983 he was awarded a National Endowment for the Arts grant. Since 1985 he has been the Artist-in-Residence, Mount Saint Benedict, Erie, Pennsylvania. He has had hundreds of exhibitions in galleries and museums around the world. His works are in over 80 museum collections.

Brother Thomas is renowned for his original glaze recipes and perfect forms and always sought to create something new and beautiful. His exacting standards made for the shattering of over 80% of each firing. One "rescued" piece, however, is now in the collection of the Museum of Fine Arts, Boston.

Brother Thomas died at his home in Erie, Pennsylvania, on 16 August 2007.

It was Brother Thomas' dream and vision to establish a Fund to help struggling artists, as he was helped in his life's journey. The Brother Thomas Fund was established under the auspices of the Boston Foundation upon the artist's death. Since 2007, proceeds from the sale of his work have gone into this Fund and in October 2009, the first eight Brother Thomas Fellowships were awarded to struggling, mid-career Boston artists in the amount of $15,000 each.

Exhibitions and honors 

 National Endowment for the Arts Grant 1983
 Retrospective Exhibition Erie Art Museum, Erie, PA 1990
 Retrospective Exhibition Art Gallery of Nova Scotia, Halifax, Nova Scotia. 1991

Known collections
 Aidekman Art Center, Tufts University, Medford, MA
 Allen Art Museum, Oberlin College, Oberlin, OH
 Art Complex Museum, Duxbury, MA (http://www.artcomplex.org/)
 Art Gallery of Nova Scotia, Halifax, Nova Scotia, Canada
 Art Institute of Chicago, Chicago, IL
 Bunting Institute, Radcliffe College, Cambridge, MA
 Canadian Museum of Civilization, Hull, Quebec, Canada
 Carnegie Museum of Art, Pittsburgh, PA
 Chrysler Museum of Art, Norfolk, VA
 Cleveland Museum of Art, Cleveland, OH
 Cooper-Hewitt, National Design Museum, Smithsonian Institution, New York, NY
 Davis Museum and Cultural Center, Wellesley College, Wellesley, MA
 Dimock Gallery, George Washington University, Washington, DC
 Everson Museum of Art, Syracuse University, Syracuse, NY
 Fleming Museum, University of Vermont, Burlington, VT
 Fogg Art Museum, Harvard University, Cambridge, MA
 Framingham State University, Framingham, MA
 Hokkaido University, Hokkaido, Japan
 Los Angeles County Museum of Art, Los Angeles, CA
 The Metropolitan Museum of Art, New York, NY
 Museum of Art, Rhode Island School of Design, Providence, RI (note on acquisition)
 Museum of Fine Arts, Boston, MA
 Phoenix Art Museum, Phoenix, AZ
 Portland Museum of Art Portland, ME
 Pucker Gallery, Boston, MA
 Roberson Museum and Science Center, Binghamton, NY
 The Rose Art Museum, Brandeis University, Waltham, MA
 Royal Ontario Museum, Toronto, Ontario, Canada
 Santa Barbara Museum of Art, Santa Barbara, CA
 St. Lawrence University, Canton, New York
 Smithsonian American Art Museum (Highlights from the Smithsonian American Art Museum)
 Tel Aviv Museum of Art, Tel Aviv, Israel
 The Tikotin Museum of Japanese Art, Haifa, Israel
 University of Massachusetts Amherst, MA
 Vatican Collection, Rome, Italy
 Victoria and Albert Museum, London, England
 Windsor Castle, Windsor, England
 Worcester Art Museum, Worcester, MA (note on acquisition)
 Yale University, New Haven, CT

Bibliography

  "Ceramics of Weston Priory/Brother Thomas" by Thomas, Brother, O.S.B.; Henning, Robert, Jr. (Curated By)
Publisher: George Walter Vincent Smith Art Museum, Springfield, MA. Date Published: 1980

  Exhibition Catalogue.  79 pp., illus. (some col. ); 23 cm. Exhibition held at the George Walter Vincent Smith Art Museum, Springfield, Massachusetts, June 1-September 7, 1980.
 "The Path to the Beautiful" Published in Boston by David R. Godine Publishers (http://godine.com/) 1988 
 Biographical Film: "Gifts From the Fire", Canadian Broadcasting Corporation, 1991 (New York Times Movie Review)
 "Gifts From the Fire". Published in Boston by Pucker Gallery, 1993
 "Creation out of Clay". Published in Boston by Pucker Gallery, 1999
 "Celebrate the Days: Brother Thomas Book of Days". Pucker Art Publications, 2000
 "This is the Day: Work and Words of Brother Thomas". Pucker Art Publications. Syracuse University Press, 978-0-8028-6312-6,  2007

Quotes 
"Art is meant to open the human heart to truth and beauty, goodness and unity. It is like a finger pointing to the moon. It is not the finger that is important, it is the moon."

"First you do what is necessary, then you do what is possible and before you know it you are doing the impossible."

"The thing we all strive for is to shape our humanity in the image of God, to do good, stand up for what is true, create what is beautiful, and live for what unites and does not divide."

Images 
 Pucker Gallery: An image gallery
 Brother Thomas Small lidded vase with celadon glaze, ca. 1980
 The Art Museum Image Consortium Library  Vase, Flask Form, Hunan Tenmoku, 1988
 Harrison Gallery: An image gallery

References

External links
 Artist information page at Pucker Gallery
 The Brother Thomas Fellowship Awards
 The Brother Thomas Fellowship Award winners 
 Ceramics Monthly – December 2006  A Long and Winding Road to Artistic Success by Richard Busch 4.4 MB PDF document
 Who's Who: Japanese Ceramic Artists
 Boston Phoenix: exhibition review September 2003
 Artist information page at The Harrison Gallery

American potters
1929 births
2007 deaths
Artists from Erie, Pennsylvania
Art Students League of New York alumni
Benedictine monks
Canadian potters
NSCAD University alumni
University of Ottawa alumni
20th-century ceramists